The Georgia Political Science Association (GPSA) is the professional association for political scientists in Georgia, United States. Founded in 1968, the GPSA holds an annual conference in Savannah, Georgia in November. Conference participants are from Georgia, other U.S. states, and overseas. Although political scientists are in the majority, the conference is definitely interdisciplinary. Participants have included political scientists, historians, economists, humanists, sociologists, criminologists, anthropologists, public administrators, philosophers, students, interested non-academics and many others. Currently, the membership numbers around 200 political scientists teaching in Georgia. The GPSA publishes a refereed online proceedings of the conference.

Both the University System of Georgia Board of Regents Academic Advisory Committee for Political Science and the European Union Studies Certificate Steering Committee traditionally meet during the conference.

The GPSA Board of Directors consists of seven officers and eight at-large board members. The GPSA Vice President and program chair organizes the annual conference program from proposals received by July 1 of each year. Panels and roundtables are assembled from the accepted proposals and individual papers.  Seven sessions of four concurrent panels each are spread over two days. Four to six presentations are assigned to each panel. All interested persons may submit proposals.

The GPSA has several awards. The McBrayer Award and an accompanying $500.00 cash prize is awarded in years when a paper of outstanding scholarship within the academic discipline of political science is presented in its entirety at the conference. The Donald T. Wells Award is given annually to a member for recognition of outstanding service to the Georgia Political Science Association. The Roger N. Pajari Undergraduate Paper Award is given annually to the best undergraduate paper submitted to meet the requirements of an undergraduate political science course taught in the state of Georgia and nominated by the professor teaching the course.

GPSA members participate in the activities of the American Political Science Association, Southern Political Science Association and the American Society for Public Administration. Question in Politics (QiP) is the scholarly journal of the Georgia Political Science Association. The first volume of QiP was published in 2013 and this journal is the continuation of the earlier Proceedings of the Georgia Political Science Association.

Past Presidents

Elmo Roberts, 1973
James McBrayer, 1974
Frank Smith, 1975
Ralph Hemphill, 1976
G.J. Foster, 1977
Donald T. Wells, 1978
Larry Elowitz, 1979
Raymond L. Chambers, 1980
Ethel A. Cullinan, 1981
Donald Fairchild, 1982
Ben DeJanes, 1983
Lane VanTassel, 1984
James Russell, 1985
Loren Peter Beth, 1986
Roger Pajari, 1987
Diane Fowlkes, 1988
Gale Harrison, 1989
Larry Taylor, 1990
Thomas Lauth, 1991
George H. Cox Jr., 1992
Joe Trachtenberg, 1993
Sandra Thornton, 1994
James Peterson, 1995
Willoughby Jarrell, 1996
Glenn Abney, 1997
Jan Mabie, 1998
Lois Duke Whitaker, 1999
Michael Baun, 2000
Charles S. Bullock, III, 2001
Gwen Wood, 2002
Michael Digby, 2003
Adam Stone, 2004
Scott E. Buchanan, 2005
Sudha Ratan, 2006
Karen McCurdy, 2007
Chris Grant, 2008
James LaPlant, 2009
Carol Pierannunzi, 2010
Greg Domin, 2011
Thomas E. Rotnem, 2012
Sandy Reinke, 2013
Unknown, 2014
James LaPlant, 2015
Tamra Ortgies-Young, 2016
Craig Albert, 2017
Matthew Hipps, 2018
Unknown, 2019
Keith Lee, 2020
Robert C. Harding, 2021

External links
Georgia Political Science Association
GPSA Board of Directors
Criminal Justice Association of Georgia
Proceedings of the annual conference
Donald T. Wells Outstanding Service Award
Roger N. Pajari Undergraduate Paper Award
Call for Proposals and Presentations
 Questions in Politics (QiP)
American Society for Public Administration
Southern Political Science Association
American Political Science Association
European Union Center of the University System of Georgia 
USG Academic Advisory Committees
GPSA Acronym
Georgia Chapter of the American Society for Public Administration
Journal of Politics

Political science organizations
Professional associations based in the United States
Political science in the United States
1968 establishments in Georgia (U.S. state)
Organizations established in 1968